AFF, Aff or aff may refer to:

Organizations
 Afghanistan Football Federation, the governing body of football in Afghanistan
 Arab Film Festival, a California nonprofit that hosts the largest Arab film festival in the US
 Armed Forces Foundation, a military non-profit support group
 ASEAN Football Federation, a subset of nations within the Asian Football Confederation from Southeast Asia
 Aspies For Freedom, a group advocating autism rights
 Austin Film Festival, a film festival in Austin, Texas
 Australian Fencing Federation, the governing body of the Olympic sport of fencing in Australia

Transport
 Affluence stop, MTR station code "AFF"
 United States Air Force Academy, which has the IATA airport code "AFF"

Other uses
 A Fine Frenzy, a singer
 Accelerated freefall, a method of skydiving training
 Adult FriendFinder, a commercial dating website
 Advance-fee fraud, a confidence trick in which the target is persuaded to advance relatively small sums of money in the hope of realizing a much larger gain
 aff., an abbreviation for affinis in biological open nomenclature
 Automated Flight Following (AFF), a US Department of Agriculture system to track firefighting aircraft 
 Aff (river), in western France
 Advanced Fighting Fantasy, a British fantasy tabletop roleplaying game